Lindsay Sabadosa is an American activist and politician. She is the first woman to hold the 1st Hampshire district seat in the Massachusetts House of Representatives.

Early life 
Lindsay Sabadosa has her AB from Wellesley College and her MSc from the University of Edinburgh. She was the recipient of the Wellesley-Yenching Program Fellowship, which led her to spend a year in Nanjing, China as a fellow at Ginling College at Nanjing University.

She later moved to Italy where she worked in Marketing & Communications at CUP2000, a company in Bologna that strives to improve access and delivery of health care and provide telemedicine solutions throughout the European Union. In the same period, she opened her own small business, a translation firm, specializing in Italian and French legal and financial translation with a focus on international litigation, contract law, and finance.

Political Activity 

Sabadosa organized her first protest march at the age of nine to protest the closing of her hometown library due to budget cuts. She quickly became involved in political campaigns starting in high school, volunteering on campaigns for former Congressman John Olver, former Senator John Kerry, and several local officials. She soon began to focus her electoral work on women candidates, working for both local and state-wide women candidates, and ultimately joining the Board of Directors of Emerge Massachusetts in order to deepen and expand her interest in building benches.

She is a long-standing volunteer with the Planned Parenthood Advocacy Fund of Massachusetts and on the Board (and intake team) of the Abortion Rights Fund of Western Massachusetts. She is also a founding board member of DARLA, the Doula Association for Reproductive Loss and Abortion, which brought abortion and reproductive loss doula training to the Pioneer Valley for the first time. She also sits on the statewide organizing committees for Medicare for All and helped found the Western Massachusetts Safe Communities Act coalition. She is also an active member of the Northampton Democratic City Committee and frequently represents her ward at the Democratic State Convention.

Sabadosa was first elected to the State House of Representatives in 2018, becoming the first woman to represent the First Hampshire District. In 2020 she was re-elected in an uncontested race.

Committees 
Sabadosa serves on the Joint Committee on Transportation, Election Laws, and Cannabis Policy. She is on the House Committee on Steering, Policy, and Oversight.

Women's March 

In 2016, she joined the Massachusetts Chapter of the Women's March on Washington mere days after the election, organizing contingents travelling to Washington DC and Boston as well as a local march in Northampton. In February 2017, she created the Pioneer Valley Women's March (PVWM), which has gone on to organize dozens of community events on a variety of social justice issues with particular focus on involving the community in state-level advocacy. In January 2018, PVWM held its anniversary march in Northampton with over 5,000 participants, the largest march ever held in the city.  PVWM is now part of the Pioneer Valley Resist Coalition, a group of over 30 grassroots activist and advocacy organizations that focus on social and environmental justice.

Personal life
Sabadosa lives in Northampton with her daughter.

See also
 2019–2020 Massachusetts legislature
 2021–2022 Massachusetts legislature

References

External links
Sabadosa legislative website
Sabadosa campaign website

Women state legislators in Massachusetts
Living people
Year of birth missing (living people)
Democratic Party members of the Massachusetts House of Representatives
Wellesley College alumni
Alumni of the University of Edinburgh
People from Northampton, Massachusetts
American abortion-rights activists
American feminists
Activists from Massachusetts
Place of birth missing (living people)
21st-century American women